Network is a Canadian variety television series which aired on CTV for one season during the 1962-63 television season. The show was co-hosted by Bill Brady and Denyse Ange. Live and taped segments were aired from either the studio or elsewhere in Canada.

External links 

 TVArchive.ca article
 

1962 Canadian television series debuts
1963 Canadian television series endings
CTV Television Network original programming
1960s Canadian variety television series